George Blanchard may refer to:
George Blanchard, Sr, Governor of the Absentee Shawnee Tribe 2009–2013
George S. Blanchard (1920–2006), U.S. Army general
George Washington Blanchard (1884–1964), U.S. politician
Georges Maurice Jean Blanchard (1877–1954), French general
George Blanchard (architect) (1891–1978), Canadian architect and Ontario mayor